Gulyayevsky is a rural locality (a khutor) in Bocharovskoye Rural Settlement, Novoanninsky District, Volgograd Oblast, Russia. The population was 242 as of 2010. There are 6 streets.

Geography 
Gulyayevsky is located 19 km southeast of Novoanninsky (the district's administrative centre) by road. Kuznetsovsky is the nearest rural locality.

References 

Rural localities in Novoanninsky District